Shelmalier or Shelmaliere (Irish: Síol Maoluír, from Old Irish Síl Máel Uidir, "Offspring of Bald Uidir") is an area in County Wexford, Ireland.  It comprises two baronies, East Shelmaliere and West Shelmaliere.

The farmers of east Shelmalier were accustomed to shoot wild fowl on the North sloblands.

The area is mentioned in Patrick Joseph McCall's ballads Kelly the Boy from Killanne and  Boolavogue.

Wexford, County Wexford
Baronies of County Wexford